Phyllidiopsis monacha is a species of sea slug, a dorid nudibranch, a shell-less marine gastropod mollusk in the family Phyllidiidae.

Distribution 
This species was described from Creek, Jeddah, Red Sea . It is endemic to the Red Sea.

Description
This nudibranch has a white dorsum with a pattern of black and orange. The black pigment forms an irregular ring around the middle of the back with radiating lines extending to the mantle edge. The centre of the back and the edges of the mantle between the black markings have patches of orange-yellow. The rhinophores are also orange-yellow. It is a small Phyllidiid, growing to 20 mm in length.

Diet
This species feeds on a sponge.

References

Phyllidiidae
Gastropods described in 1986